Nudariphleps is a monotypic moth genus in the subfamily Erebidae. Its only species, Nudariphleps gauldi, is found in Borneo. Both the genus and the species were first described by Jeremy Daniel Holloway in 2001.

References

Arctiinae
Monotypic moth genera